Sangyaw Festival is a religious and socio-cultural event in the Philippines. It was revived in 2008 by the city government of Tacloban, Philippines. Sangyaw means "to herald news" in Waray language. Various festival-participants from different parts of the country participate in this tribal procession.  It was held a day before the city fiesta.  The festival was first held in 1974 but was cancelled in 1987.

See also
Pintados-Kasadyaan

References

Visayan festivals
Culture of Leyte (province)
Tourist attractions in Tacloban
Recurring events established in 1974